CrossCurrents is a quarterly academic journal published by the Association for Public Religion and Intellectual Life (before 1990, it was published by the Convergence). Now published as a peer-reviewed academic journal

Abstracting and indexing 
The journal is abstracted and indexed in the following databases:
 Academic ASAP
 Academic Search Elite
 America: History and Life
 ATLA Religion Database
 EBSCO databases
 Expanded Academic ASAP
 FRANCIS
 Historical Abstracts
 InfoTrac
 JSTOR
 MLA International Bibliography
 ProQuest

References

External links 
 

Quarterly journals
Publications established in 1950
Religious studies journals
English-language journals
Wiley (publisher) academic journals
1950 establishments in the United States